The Brilon Wald station is a station on the Upper Ruhr Valley Railway in the German state of North Rhine-Westphalia. It was opened 5.5 km south of Brilon in the forest (Wald) with the construction of the line on 10 February 1873, as it was impractical to build the railway through Brilon. The station was called Brilon-Corbach until 1880, when the current name was adopted.
The Bergisch-Märkische Railway Company (Bergisch-Märkische Eisenbahn-Gesellschaft) created the small town of Brilon Wald at the same time. The station is classified by Deutsche Bahn as a category 5 station.

Brilon Wald station is served by passenger services by line RE 17(Sauerland-Express) every 60 minutes, line R 42 (Upland-Bahn) every 120 minutes and by some RE 57 (Dortmund-Sauerland-Express) services extended from Winterberg:

Brilon Wald station is also served by bus line 482 running between Brilon and Gudenhagen every 60 minutes.

Notes

Railway stations in North Rhine-Westphalia
Railway stations in Germany opened in 1873
Buildings and structures in Hochsauerlandkreis